Aku Alho (born June 27, 1997) is a Finnish professional ice hockey defenceman who is currently playing for Ketterä on loan from Jukurit.

Career
Alho began his career in his hometown of Espoo, playing for Blues's junior teams until 2016 when he joined Jukurit. He made his Liiga for Jukurit on January 25, 2018 against Sport and played ten games in total during the 2017–18 season.

On September 18, 2018, Alho joined Mestis side Ketterä on loan for the 2018–19 season. Alho returned to Jukurit's roster to play a regular season game on September 21, 2019, also against Sport, before being loaned back to Ketterä on October 7, 2019 for an indefinite period.

References

External links

1997 births
Living people
Finnish ice hockey defencemen
Imatran Ketterä players
Mikkelin Jukurit players
Sportspeople from Espoo